Bert Lord (December 4, 1869 – May 24, 1939) was an American politician from New York.  A Republican, he served several terms in the New York State Assembly and New York State Senate, and was a member of the United States House of Representatives from 1935 until his death.

Life
Born in the town of Sanford, Broome County, he attended the public schools and the Afton Union School and Academy.  He engaged in the mercantile business at Afton from 1893 to 1918, when he entered the lumber business and operated sawmills.

He was Afton's town supervisor from 1905 to 1915; and a member of the New York State Assembly (Chenango Co.) in 1915, 1916, 1917, 1918, 1919, 1920 and 1921.

He was New York State Commissioner of Motor Vehicles from 1921 to 1923.

He was again a member of the State Assembly in 1924, 1925, 1926, 1927, 1928 and 1929.  On November 5, 1929, he was re-elected to the Assembly; on November 25 State Senator B. Roger Wales died, and Lord ran to succeed him.

On January 3, 1930, Lord was elected to the New York State Senate (40th D.).  He served in the Senate until 1934, sitting in the 153rd, 154th, 155th, 156th and 157th New York State Legislatures.

Lord was elected as a Republican to the 74th, 75th and 76th United States Congresses; he served from January 3, 1935 until his death.

Lord suffered two heart attacks in May 1939.  The second one proved fatal, and he died in Washington, D.C., on May 24, 1939.  He was buried at Glenwood Cemetery in Afton.

Family
Lord was married twice; his first wife was Lillian (Kniskern) Lord (1872-1937), and in December 1938 he married Margaret T. Gregg, who survived him.  Lord had no children.

See also
 List of United States Congress members who died in office (1900–49)

References

Sources

Newspapers

Books

External sources

1869 births
1939 deaths
People from Broome County, New York
Republican Party members of the New York State Assembly
Republican Party New York (state) state senators
People from Afton, New York
Republican Party members of the United States House of Representatives from New York (state)